Tovea Jenkins (born 27 October 1992) is a Jamaican athlete. She competed in the women's 400 metres at the 2018 IAAF World Indoor Championships.

References

External links

1992 births
Living people
Jamaican female sprinters
Athletes (track and field) at the 2018 Commonwealth Games
Place of birth missing (living people)
Commonwealth Games competitors for Jamaica
Athletes (track and field) at the 2020 Summer Olympics
Olympic athletes of Jamaica